The 2015–16 Plunket Shield was the 87th season of official first-class cricket in New Zealand. The competition started on 15 October 2015, and ran to 2 April 2016. Auckland won the competition following a draw in their match against Wellington in round nine of the competition.

Teams

Squads

Points table

 Winner

Fixtures

Round 1

Round 2

Round 3

Round 4

Round 5

Round 6

Round 7

Round 8

Round 9

Round 10

References

External links
 Series home at ESPN Cricinfo

Plunket Shield
2015–16 New Zealand cricket season
Plunket Shield